Syncovery (Super Flexible File Synchronizer until 2012) is backup and file synchronization software that allows backing up and synchronizing files to the same or different drives, to different media (CD, DVD, Flash, zip), or to a remote server.

Features
 Like Allway Sync, GoodSync and Unison, it has the capability to remember the previous state of directories in a database, and thus also synchronize deletions. It can also detect moved files and move them on the other side.
 The program fully supports Unicode characters so that it can copy filenames in all languages.
 Includes a scheduler.
 Support for various Internet protocols, including FTP, FTPS, SFTP/SSH, WebDAV, SSL, HTTP, and Amazon S3 web storage.
 Compression and Encryption Support. 
 Copy files locked by the operating system. 
 Versioning, i.e. the ability to keep multiple older versions of each file in the backup.
 Partial File Updating
 File masks & filters.

See also 
File synchronization
Backup
Disk image
List of backup software
List of disk imaging software

References

External links
 http://www.syncovery.com

Backup software